Cristian Ramos may refer to:

 Cristian García Ramos (b. 1981), Spanish footballer
 Christian Ramos, Peruvian footballer who played at the 2007 South American Youth Championship